Since the last administrative reform in 1975, the City of Cologne is made up of nine Stadtbezirke and 86 Stadtteile. Stadtbezirk literally translates as city district, which are further subdivided into Stadtteile (city parts). The Stadtteile of Cologne's old and new town (Alt- and Neustadt) further consist of quarters, known as "Veedel" in both Kölsch and most often, the Rhinelandic regiolect, as well.
 
City districts are differentiated of being links- or rechtsrheinisch – left or right of the Rhine, with the old town being left of the Rhine, as are 230,25 km2 (56.8 percent of 405,14 km2 within city limits), while 174,87 km2 (43.2 percent) lie right of the Rhine. In regard to population, Cologne is the largest city in the state of North Rhine-Westphalia and the fourth largest city in Germany.

Districts

Growth of urban area 

Since the city's foundation in 38 BC, Cologne grew through numerous extensions and incorporation of surrounding municipalities. Since the construction of the Medieval wall in 1180, the area of the old imperial city of Cologne has not changed for more than 600 years and was only extended over the old city walls in 1794, just short before the arrival of French troops and Cologne's incorporation into the First French Empire.

After 1815, the Kingdom of Prussia enforced the construction of fortifications which again hindered any growth for the city. Only with the acquisition of these fortifications in 1881, the city of Cologne had the possibility of a gradual territorial expansion. On 12. November 1883 a strip of territory from parts of the municipalities of Ehrenfeld, Kriel, Longerich, Müngersdorf and Rondorf was added to the city. At the time of the industrial revolution, industrial enterprises already avoided the densely populated areas inside of the city limits and settled in the small towns outside the fortified area, while maintaining close economic links to the city of Cologne. More than half of the estates here were in the hands of citizens of Cologne or the same becoming residents in these areas.

Since 1886, the Cologne City Council intensified negotiations with the surrounding communities, and on 1 April 1888 ended in a first major incorporation. Since then the city has expanded with major reorganizations in 1910, 1914, 1922 and 1975.

Source: Historical Archive of the City of Cologne

References

External links 
 Official site of the Stadtbezirke 

 
Cologne
Cologne-related lists